The following is an alphabetical list of members of the United States House of Representatives from the state of New Mexico.  For chronological tables of members of both houses of the United States Congress from the state (through the present day), see United States congressional delegations from New Mexico.  The list of names should be complete (as of January 3, 2019), but other data may be incomplete. It includes members who have represented both the state and the territory, both past and present.

Current members 

Updated January 2023.

 : Melanie Stansbury (D) (since 2021)
 : Gabe Vasquez (D) (since 2023)
 : Teresa Leger Fernandez (D) (since 2021)

List of members and delegates

See also

List of United States senators from New Mexico
United States congressional delegations from New Mexico
New Mexico's congressional districts

References

 
New Mexico
United States Rep